This is an incomplete list of Statutory Rules of Northern Ireland in 1997.

1-100

 Buses (Section 10B Permits) (Amendment) Regulations (Northern Ireland) 1997 (S.R. 1997 No. 1)
 Temporary Speed Limit (Upper Ballinderry, Lisburn) Order (Northern Ireland) 1997 (S.R. 1997 No. 2)
 Social Security (Non-Dependent Deductions) Regulations (Northern Ireland) 1997 (S.R. 1997 No. 3)
 Housing Benefit (General) (Amendment) Regulations (Northern Ireland) 1997 (S.R. 1997 No. 4)
 Temporary Speed Limit (Lisnevenagh Road, Route A26, Kells) Order (Northern Ireland) 1997 (S.R. 1997 No. 5)
 Rates (Making and Levying of Different Rates) Regulations (Northern Ireland) 1997 (S.R. 1997 No. 6)
 Occupational Pension Schemes (Contracting-out) (Transitional) Regulations (Northern Ireland) 1997 (S.R. 1997 No. 7)
 Occupational Pension Schemes (Indexation) Regulations (Northern Ireland) 1997 (S.R. 1997 No. 8)
 Parking Places on Roads (Amendment) Order (Northern Ireland) 1997 (S.R. 1997 No. 9)
 Plant Health (Wood and Bark) Order (Northern Ireland) 1997 (S.R. 1997 No. 11)
 Ports (Levy on Disposals of Land, etc.) Order (Northern Ireland) 1997 (S.R. 1997 No. 12)
 Hill Livestock (Compensatory Allowances) (Amendment) Regulations (Northern Ireland) 1997 (S.R. 1997 No. 13)
 County Court (Amendment) Rules (Northern Ireland) 1997 (S.R. 1997 No. 17)
 Registration of Clubs (Certificate of Registration) Regulations (Northern Ireland) 1997 (S.R. 1997 No. 18)
 Licensing (Form of Children's Certificate) Regulations (Northern Ireland) 1997 (S.R. 1997 No. 19)
 Licensing (Form of Licence) Regulations (Northern Ireland) 1997 (S.R. 1997 No. 20)
 Income-Related Benefits and Jobseeker's Allowance (Miscellaneous Amendments) Regulations (Northern Ireland) 1997 (S.R. 1997 No. 22)
 Registered Rents (Increase) Order (Northern Ireland) 1997 (S.R. 1997 No. 23)
 Education (Assessment Arrangements for Key Stage 3) (Amendment) Order (Northern Ireland) 1997 (S.R. 1997 No. 24)
 One-Way Traffic (Whitehead) Order (Northern Ireland) 1997 (S.R. 1997 No. 25)
 Licensing (Requirements for Conference Centre) Regulations (Northern Ireland) 1997 (S.R. 1997 No. 26)
 Registration (Land and Deeds) (1992 Order) (Commencement No. 3) Order (Northern Ireland) 1997 (S.R. 1997 No. 27)
 Registration of Deeds Regulations (Northern Ireland) 1997 (S.R. 1997 No. 28)
 Health and Safety (Petroleum-Spirit Licence Fees) Regulations (Northern Ireland) 1997 (S.R. 1997 No. 29)
 Social Security (Contracting-out and Qualifying Earnings Factor) Regulations (Northern Ireland) 1997 (S.R. 1997 No. 31)
 Proceeds of Crime (Northern Ireland) Order 1996 (Amendment) Order 1997 (S.R. 1997 No. 32)
 Prohibition of Right-Hand Turn (Portadown) (Amendment) Order (Northern Ireland) 1997 (S.R. 1997 No. 33)
 One-Way Traffic (Strabane) (Amendment) Order (Northern Ireland) 1997 (S.R. 1997 No. 34)
 Artificial Insemination of Cattle (Amendment) Regulations (Northern Ireland) 1997 (S.R. 1997 No. 35)
 Industrial Tribunals (1996 Order) (Commencement) Order (Northern Ireland) 1997 (S.R. 1997 No. 36)
 Pensions (1995 Order) (Commencement No. 6) Order (Northern Ireland) 1997 (S.R. 1997 No. 37)
 Personal and Occupational Pension Schemes (Pensions Ombudsman) (Procedure) (Amendment) Rules (Northern Ireland) 1997 (S.R. 1997 No. 38)
 Personal and Occupational Pension Schemes (Pensions Ombudsman) Regulations (Northern Ireland) 1997 (S.R. 1997 No. 39)
 Occupational Pension Schemes (Requirement to obtain Audited Accounts and a Statement from the Auditor) Regulations (Northern Ireland) 1997 (S.R. 1997 No. 40)
 Airports (Designation) (Facilities for Consultation) Order (Northern Ireland) 1997 (S.R. 1997 No. 41)
 Royal Ulster Constabulary (Discipline and Disciplinary Appeals) (Amendment) Regulations 1997 (S.R. 1997 No. 42)
 Royal Ulster Constabulary Reserve (Part-time) (Discipline and Disciplinary Appeals) (Amendment) Regulations 1997 (S.R. 1997 No. 43)
 Industrial Training (Construction Board) (Amendment) Order (Northern Ireland) 1997 (S.R. 1997 No. 45)
 Industrial Training Levy (Construction Industry) (Amendment) Order (Northern Ireland) 1997 (S.R. 1997 No. 46)
 Rates Regulations (Northern Ireland) 1997 (S.R. 1997 No. 49)
 Rates (Making and Levying of Different Rates) (No. 2) Regulations (Northern Ireland) 1997 (S.R. 1997 No. 50)
 Employer's Liability (Compulsory Insurance) Exemption (Amendment) Regulations (Northern Ireland) 1997 (S.R. 1997 No. 51)
 Waste Collection and Disposal (Amendment) Regulations (Northern Ireland) 1997 (S.R. 1997 No. 52)
 Suckler Cow Premium (Amendment) Regulations (Northern Ireland) 1997 (S.R. 1997 No. 53)
 Prohibition of Traffic (Causeway End Road, Unclassified No. 41, Lisburn) Order (Northern Ireland) 1997 (S.R. 1997 No. 54)
 Roads (Speed Limit) Order (Northern Ireland) 1997 (S.R. 1997 No. 55)
 Personal and Occupational Pension Schemes (Protected Rights) Regulations (Northern Ireland) 1997 (S.R. 1997 No. 56)
 Road Transport Licensing (Fees) Regulations (Northern Ireland) 1997 (S.R. 1997 No. 57)
 Roads (Speed Limit) (No. 2) Order (Northern Ireland) 1997 (S.R. 1997 No. 58)
 County Court (Amendment No. 2) Rules (Northern Ireland) 1997 (S.R. 1997 No. 61)
 Magistrates' Courts (Licensing) Rules (Northern Ireland) 1997 (S.R. 1997 No. 62)
 Magistrates' Courts (Registration of Clubs) Rules (Northern Ireland) 1997 (S.R. 1997 No. 63)
 Level Crossing (Meigh) Order (Northern Ireland) 1997 (S.R. 1997 No. 65)
 Level Crossing (Lurgan (Bells Row)) Order (Northern Ireland) 1997 (S.R. 1997 No. 66)
 Level Crossing (Lurgan (Lake Street)) Order (Northern Ireland) 1997 (S.R. 1997 No. 67)
 Level Crossing (Poyntzpass) Order (Northern Ireland) 1997 (S.R. 1997 No. 68)
 Social Security (Disability Living Allowance and Attendance Allowance) (Amendment) Regulations (Northern Ireland) 1997 (S.R. 1997 No. 69)
 Rules of the Supreme Court (Northern Ireland) (Amendment) 1997 (S.R. 1997 No. 70)
 Tribunal (Amendment) Regulations (Northern Ireland) 1997 (S.R. 1997 No. 71)
 Business Tenancies (Notices) Regulations (Northern Ireland) 1997 (S.R. 1997 No. 72)
 Lands Tribunal (Amendment) Rules (Northern Ireland) 1997 (S.R. 1997 No. 73)
 Business Tenancies (1996 Order) (Commencement) Order (Northern Ireland) 1997 (S.R. 1997 No. 74)
 Licensing (Register of Licences) Regulations (Northern Ireland) 1997 (S.R. 1997 No. 75)
 Registration of Clubs (Required Information) Regulations (Northern Ireland) 1997 (S.R. 1997 No. 76)
 Registration of Clubs (Display of Notice) Regulation (Northern Ireland) 1997 (S.R. 1997 No. 77)
 Registration of Clubs (Certificate of Registration) Regulations (Northern Ireland) 1997 (S.R. 1997 No. 78)
 Assistance for Minor Works to Dwellings (Amendment) Regulations (Northern Ireland) 1997 (S.R. 1997 No. 79)
 Rates (Industrial Hereditaments) Order (Northern Ireland) 1997 (S.R. 1997 No. 80)
 Valuation for Rating (Decapitalisation Rate) Regulations (Northern Ireland) 1997 (S.R. 1997 No. 81)
 Valuation (Telecommunications) Regulations (Northern Ireland) 1997 (S.R. 1997 No. 82)
 Valuation for Rating (Docks) Order (Northern Ireland) 1997 (S.R. 1997 No. 83)
 Valuation for Rating (Plant and Machinery) Order (Northern Ireland) 1997 (S.R. 1997 No. 84)
 Roads (Speed Limit) (No. 3) Order (Northern Ireland) 1997 (S.R. 1997 No. 85)
 Prison and Young Offenders Centre (Amendment) Rules (Northern Ireland) 1997 (S.R. 1997 No. 86)
 Animals and Animal Products (Import and Export) (Amendment) Regulations (Northern Ireland) 1997 (S.R. 1997 No. 87)
 Conservation of Scallops Regulations (Northern Ireland) 1997 (S.R. 1997 No. 89)
 Legal Aid (Financial Conditions) Regulations (Northern Ireland) 1997 (S.R. 1997 No. 90)
 Legal Advice and Assistance (Amendment) Regulations (Northern Ireland) 1997 (S.R. 1997 No. 91)
 Legal Advice and Assistance (Financial Conditions) Regulations (Northern Ireland) 1997 (S.R. 1997 No. 92)
 Licensing (Requirements for Accommodation for Guests) (Revocation) Regulations (Northern Ireland) 1997 (S.R. 1997 No. 93)
 Occupational Pension Schemes (Scheme Administration) Regulations (Northern Ireland) 1997 (S.R. 1997 No. 94)
 Occupational Pension Schemes (Mixed Benefit Contracted-out Schemes) Regulations (Northern Ireland) 1997 (S.R. 1997 No. 95)
 Occupational Pension Schemes (Payments to Employers) Regulations (Northern Ireland) 1997 (S.R. 1997 No. 96)
 Occupational Pension Schemes (Modification of Schemes) Regulations (Northern Ireland) 1997 (S.R. 1997 No. 97)
 Occupational Pension Schemes (Disclosure of Information) Regulations (Northern Ireland) 1997 (S.R. 1997 No. 98)
 Occupational Pension Schemes (Independent Trustee) Regulations (Northern Ireland) 1997 (S.R. 1997 No. 99)
 Social Security (Contributions) (Amendment) Regulations (Northern Ireland) 1997 (S.R. 1997 No. 100)

101-200

 Health and Personal Social Services (Superannuation) (Provision of Information and Administrative Expenses etc.) Regulations (Northern Ireland) 1997 (S.R. 1997 No. 101)
 Register of Occupational and Personal Pension Schemes Regulations (Northern Ireland) 1997 (S.R. 1997 No. 102)
 Planning (Fees) (Amendment) Regulations (Northern Ireland) 1997 (S.R. 1997 No. 104)
 Guaranteed Minimum Pensions Increase Order (Northern Ireland) 1997 (S.R. 1997 No. 105)
 Railways (Rateable Value) Order (Northern Ireland) 1997 (S.R. 1997 No. 106)
 Rates (Transitional Relief) Order (Northern Ireland) 1997 (S.R. 1997 No. 107)
 Eggs (Marketing Standards) (Amendment) Regulations (Northern Ireland) 1997 (S.R. 1997 No. 108)
 Motor Vehicles (Authorisation of Special Types) Order (Northern Ireland) 1997 (S.R. 1997 No. 109)
 Plant Health (Amendment) Order (Northern Ireland) 1997 (S.R. 1997 No. 110)
 Dental Charges (Amendment) Regulations (Northern Ireland) 1997 (S.R. 1997 No. 111)
 Social Security (Incapacity for Work) (General) (Amendment) Regulations (Northern Ireland) 1997 (S.R. 1997 No. 112)
 Social Security Benefits Up-rating Order (Northern Ireland) 1997 (S.R. 1997 No. 113)
 Social Security (Contributions) (Re-rating and Northern Ireland National Insurance Fund Payments) Order (Northern Ireland) 1997 (S.R. 1997 No. 114)
 Rates (Regional Rates) Order (Northern Ireland) 1997 (S.R. 1997 No. 115)
 Social Security (Contributions) (Amendment No. 2) Regulations (Northern Ireland) 1997 (S.R. 1997 No. 116)
 Health and Personal Social Services (Disciplinary Procedures) (Amendment) Regulations (Northern Ireland) 1997 (S.R. 1997 No. 117)
 Valuation (Electricity) Order (Northern Ireland) 1997 (S.R. 1997 No. 118)
 Rates (Restriction on Amount Recoverable) Order (Northern Ireland) 1997 (S.R. 1997 No. 119)
 Statutory Maternity Pay (Compensation of Employers) (Amendment) Regulations (Northern Ireland) 1997 (S.R. 1997 No. 120)
 Social Security (Industrial Injuries) (Dependency) (Permitted Earnings Limits) Order (Northern Ireland) 1997 (S.R. 1997 No. 121)
 Social Security Benefits Up-rating Regulations (Northern Ireland) 1997 (S.R. 1997 No. 122)
 Housing Benefit (General) (Amendment No. 2) Regulations (Northern Ireland) 1997 (S.R. 1997 No. 123)
 Pensions Increase (Review) Order (Northern Ireland) 1997 (S.R. 1997 No. 124)
 Charges for Drugs and Appliances (Amendment) Regulations (Northern Ireland) 1997 (S.R. 1997 No. 125)
 Child Maintenance Bonus (Great Britain Reciprocal Arrangements) Regulations (Northern Ireland) 1997 (S.R. 1997 No. 126)
 Housing Benefit (General) (Amendment No. 3) Regulations (Northern Ireland) 1997 (S.R. 1997 No. 127)
 Criminal Procedure and Investigations (1996 Act) (Commencement) Order (Northern Ireland) 1997 (S.R. 1997 No. 129)
 Social Security (Miscellaneous Amendments) Regulations (Northern Ireland) 1997 (S.R. 1997 No. 130)
 Personal Social Services (Direct Payments) Regulations (Northern Ireland) 1997 (S.R. 1997 No. 131)
 Health and Social Services Trusts (Exercise of Functions) (Amendment) Regulations (Northern Ireland) 1997 (S.R. 1997 No. 132)
 Personal Social Services (Direct Payments) (1996 Order) (Commencement) Order (Northern Ireland) 1997 (S.R. 1997 No. 133)
 Pensions (1995 Order) (Commencement No. 7) Order (Northern Ireland) 1997 (S.R. 1997 No. 136)
 Local Government (Superannuation) (Milk Marketing Board for Northern Ireland) Regulations (Northern Ireland) 1997 (S.R. 1997 No. 137)
 Social Security (Jobseeker's Allowance and Mariners' Benefits) (Miscellaneous Amendments) Regulations (Northern Ireland) 1997 (S.R. 1997 No. 138)
 Personal Pension Schemes (Appropriate Schemes) Regulations (Northern Ireland) 1997 (S.R. 1997 No. 139)
 Occupational and Personal Pension Schemes (Contracting-out etc.: Review of Determinations) Regulations (Northern Ireland) 1997 (S.R. 1997 No. 140)
 Occupational Pension Schemes (Pensions Compensation Provisions) Regulations (Northern Ireland) 1997 (S.R. 1997 No. 141)
 Occupational and Personal Pension Schemes (Levy) Regulations (Northern Ireland) 1997 (S.R. 1997 No. 142)
 Occupational Pension Schemes (Prohibition of Trustees) Regulations (Northern Ireland) 1997 (S.R. 1997 No. 143)
 Revaluation (Consequential Provisions) Order (Northern Ireland) 1997 (S.R. 1997 No. 144)
 Workmen's Compensation (Supplementation) (Amendment) Regulations (Northern Ireland) 1997 (S.R. 1997 No. 145)
 Temporary Speed Limit (Belfast) Order (Northern Ireland) 1997 (S.R. 1997 No. 146)
 Health and Personal Social Services (Assessment of Resources) (Amendment) Regulations (Northern Ireland) 1997 (S.R. 1997 No. 147)
 Education (Assessment Arrangements for Key Stage 3) (Amendment No. 2) Order (Northern Ireland) 1997 (S.R. 1997 No. 148)
 Health and Safety (Repeals and Modifications) Regulations (Northern Ireland) 1997 (S.R. 1997 No. 149)
 Income-Related Benefits (Amendment) Regulations (Northern Ireland) 1997 (S.R. 1997 No. 152)
 Occupational Pension Schemes (Assignment, Forfeiture, Bankruptcy etc.) Regulations (Northern Ireland) 1997 (S.R. 1997 No. 153)
 Lobster (Conservation of Stocks) Regulations (Northern Ireland) 1997 (S.R. 1997 No. 154)
 Social Security (Social Fund and Claims and Payments) (Miscellaneous Amendments) Regulations (Northern Ireland) 1997 (S.R. 1997 No. 155)
 Social Security (Miscellaneous Amendments No. 2) Regulations (Northern Ireland) 1997 (S.R. 1997 No. 156)
 Workmen's Compensation (Supplementation) (Amendment No. 2) Regulations (Northern Ireland) 1997 (S.R. 1997 No. 157)
 Social Security (Industrial Injuries) (Miscellaneous Amendments) Regulations (Northern Ireland) 1997 (S.R. 1997 No. 158)
 Occupational Pension Schemes (Discharge of Liability) Regulations (Northern Ireland) 1997 (S.R. 1997 No. 159)
 Personal and Occupational Pension Schemes (Miscellaneous Amendments) Regulations (Northern Ireland) 1997 (S.R. 1997 No. 160)
 Occupational Pensions Regulatory Authority Regulations (Northern Ireland) 1997 (S.R. 1997 No. 161)
 Occupational Pension Schemes (Reference Scheme and Miscellaneous Amendments) Regulations (Northern Ireland) 1997 (S.R. 1997 No. 162)
 Social Security (Contributions) (Amendment No. 3) Regulations (Northern Ireland) 1997 (S.R. 1997 No. 163)
 Social Security (Adjudication) (Amendment) Regulations (Northern Ireland) 1997 (S.R. 1997 No. 164)
 Social Security (Income Support, Jobseeker's Allowance and Claims and Payments) (Miscellaneous Amendments) Regulations (Northern Ireland) 1997 (S.R. 1997 No. 165)
 Court Funds (Amendment) Rules (Northern Ireland) 1997 (S.R. 1997 No. 166)
 Occupational Pension Schemes (Age-related Payments) Regulations (Northern Ireland) 1997 (S.R. 1997 No. 167)
 Motor Vehicles (Construction and Use) (Amendment) Regulations (Northern Ireland) 1997 (S.R. 1997 No. 169)
 Housing Benefit (General) (Amendment No. 4) Regulations (Northern Ireland) 1997 (S.R. 1997 No. 170)
 Income Support (General) (Standard Interest Rate Amendment) Regulations (Northern Ireland) 1997 (S.R. 1997 No. 171)
 Animals (Records) Order (Northern Ireland) 1997 (S.R. 1997 No. 172)
 Identification and Movement of Sheep and Goats Order (Northern Ireland) 1997 (S.R. 1997 No. 173)
 Social Security (Incapacity for Work and Severe Disablement Allowance) (Amendment) Regulations (Northern Ireland) 1997 (S.R. 1997 No. 174)
 Supreme Court Fees (Amendment) Order (Northern Ireland) 1997 (S.R. 1997 No. 175)
 Supreme Court (Non-Contentious Probate) Fees (Amendment) Order (Northern Ireland) 1997 (S.R. 1997 No. 176)
 Family Proceedings Fees (Amendment) Order (Northern Ireland) 1997 (S.R. 1997 No. 177)
 County Court Fees (Amendment) Order (Northern Ireland) 1997 (S.R. 1997 No. 178)
 Magistrates' Courts Fees (Amendment) Order (Northern Ireland) 1997 (S.R. 1997 No. 179)
 Social Security (Contributions) (Amendment No. 4) Regulations (Northern Ireland) 1997 (S.R. 1997 No. 180)
 Diseases of Animals (Modification) Order (Northern Ireland) 1997 (S.R. 1997 No. 181)
 Pharmaceutical Services (1992 Order) (Commencement) Order (Northern Ireland) 1997 (S.R. 1997 No. 182)
 Social Security (Jamaica) Order (Northern Ireland) 1997 (S.R. 1997 No. 183)
 Health and Personal Social Services (Fund-holding Practices) (Amendment) Regulations (Northern Ireland) 1997 (S.R. 1997 No. 184)
 Travelling Expenses and Remission of Charges (Amendment) Regulations (Northern Ireland) 1997 (S.R. 1997 No. 185)
 Health and Social Services Trusts (Originating Capital Debt) Order (Northern Ireland) 1997 (S.R. 1997 No. 186)
 Curriculum (Programmes of Study in Economics, Political Studies and Social and Environmental Studies at Key Stage 4) Order (Northern Ireland) 1997 (S.R. 1997 No. 187)
 Education Reform (1989 Order) (Commencement No. 8) Order (Northern Ireland) 1997 (S.R. 1997 No. 188)
 Curriculum (Complaints Tribunals) (Amendment) Regulations (Northern Ireland) 1997 (S.R. 1997 No. 189)
 General Medical and Pharmaceutical Services (Amendment) Regulations (Northern Ireland) 1997 (S.R. 1997 No. 190)
 Optical Charges and Payments Regulations (Northern Ireland) 1997 (S.R. 1997 No. 191)
 Pensions (1995 Order) (Commencement No. 8) Order (Northern Ireland) 1997 (S.R. 1997 No. 192)
 Pipelines Safety Regulations (Northern Ireland) 1997 (S.R. 1997 No. 193)
 Gas Safety (Installation and Use) Regulations (Northern Ireland) 1997 (S.R. 1997 No. 194)
 Gas Safety (Management) Regulations (Northern Ireland) 1997 (S.R. 1997 No. 195)
 Urban Clearways Order (Northern Ireland) 1997 (S.R. 1997 No. 197)
 Northern Ireland Disability Council Regulations (Northern Ireland) 1997 (S.R. 1997 No. 200)

201-300

 Control of Traffic (Belfast) Order (Northern Ireland) 1997 (S.R. 1997 No. 201)
 Education (Assessment Arrangements for Key Stage 3) (Amendment No. 3) Order (Northern Ireland) 1997 (S.R. 1997 No. 203)
 Social Security Revaluation of Earnings Factors Order (Northern Ireland) 1997 (S.R. 1997 No. 204)
 Urban Clearway (Greystone Road, Route B95, Antrim) Order (Northern Ireland) 1997 (S.R. 1997 No. 205)
 Roads (Speed Limit) (No. 4) Order (Northern Ireland) 1997 (S.R. 1997 No. 206)
 One-Way Traffic (Belfast) (Amendment) Order (Northern Ireland) 1997 (S.R. 1997 No. 207)
 Bus Lanes (Malone Road, Belfast) Order (Northern Ireland) 1997 (S.R. 1997 No. 211)
 Parking Places on Roads Order (Northern Ireland) 1997 (S.R. 1997 No. 212)
 Infant Formula and Follow-on Formula (Amendment) Regulations (Northern Ireland) 1997 (S.R. 1997 No. 213)
 Street Works (1995 Order) (Commencement No. 2) Order (Northern Ireland) 1997 (S.R. 1997 No. 215)
 Health and Personal Social Services (Superannuation) (Amendment) Regulations (Northern Ireland) 1997 (S.R. 1997 No. 217)
 Fresh Meat (Import Conditions) Regulations (Northern Ireland) 1997 (S.R. 1997 No. 218)
 Measuring Equipment (Liquid Fuel by Road Tanker) (Amendment) Regulations (Northern Ireland) 1997 (S.R. 1997 No. 220)
 Newry and Mourne Health and Social Services Trust (Establishment) (Amendment) Order (Northern Ireland) 1997 (S.R. 1997 No. 221)
 Craigavon and Banbridge Community Health and Social Services Trust (Establishment) (Amendment) Order (Northern Ireland) 1997 (S.R. 1997 No. 222)
 Salaries (Assembly Ombudsman and Commissioner for Complaints) Order (Northern Ireland) 1997 (S.R. 1997 No. 224)
 Health and Safety (Medical Fees) Regulations (Northern Ireland) 1997 (S.R. 1997 No. 225)
 Animals (Scientific Procedures) Act 1986 (Appropriate Methods of Humane Killing) Order (Northern Ireland) 1997 (S.R. 1997 No. 226)
 Food Premises (Registration) (Amendment) Regulations (Northern Ireland) 1997 (S.R. 1997 No. 227)
 Health and Safety (Enforcing Authority) Regulations (Northern Ireland) 1997 (S.R. 1997 No. 229)
 Specified Bovine Material (Treatment and Disposal) Regulations (Northern Ireland) 1997 (S.R. 1997 No. 230)
 Specified Bovine Material Order (Northern Ireland) 1997 (S.R. 1997 No. 231)
 Education (Individual Pupils' Achievements) (Information) (Amendment) Regulations (Northern Ireland) 1997 (S.R. 1997 No. 232)
 Health and Safety (Miscellaneous Fees Amendment) Regulations (Northern Ireland) 1997 (S.R. 1997 No. 234)
 Public Order (Prescribed Form) Regulations (Northern Ireland) 1997 (S.R. 1997 No. 235)
 Health and Personal Social Services (Superannuation) (Provision of Information and Administrative Expenses etc.) (Amendment) Regulations (Northern Ireland) 1997 (S.R. 1997 No. 236)
 Seeds (Miscellaneous Amendments) Regulations (Northern Ireland) 1997 (S.R. 1997 No. 240)
 Driving Licences (Community Driving Licence) Regulations (Northern Ireland) 1997 (S.R. 1997 No. 241)
 Local Government (General Grant) Order (Northern Ireland) 1997 (S.R. 1997 No. 242)
 Pesticides (Maximum Residue Levels in Crops, Food and Feeding Stuffs) (National Limits) (Amendment) Regulations (Northern Ireland) 1997 (S.R. 1997 No. 243)
 Pesticides (Maximum Residue Levels in Crops, Food and Feeding Stuffs) (EEC Limits) (Amendment) Regulations (Northern Ireland) 1997 (S.R. 1997 No. 244)
 Plant Protection Products (Fees) (Amendment) Regulations (Northern Ireland) 1997 (S.R. 1997 No. 246)
 Carriage of Dangerous Goods (Classification, Packaging and Labelling) and Use of Transportable Pressure Receptacles Regulations (Northern Ireland) 1997 (S.R. 1997 No. 247)
 Carriage of Dangerous Goods by Road Regulations (Northern Ireland) 1997 (S.R. 1997 No. 248)
 Carriage of Dangerous Goods by Road (Driver Training) Regulations (Northern Ireland) 1997 (S.R. 1997 No. 249)
 New Aghalane Bridge Order (Northern Ireland) 1997 (S.R. 1997 No. 250)
 Open-Ended Investment Companies (Investment Companies with Variable Capital) Regulations (Northern Ireland) 1997 (S.R. 1997 No. 251)
 Welfare Foods (Amendment) Regulations (Northern Ireland) 1997 (S.R. 1997 No. 252)
 Road Traffic (1995 Order) (Commencement) Order (Northern Ireland) 1997 (S.R. 1997 No. 253)
 Protection of Water Against Agricultural Nitrate Pollution (Amendment) Regulations (Northern Ireland) 1997 (S.R. 1997 No. 256)
 Sweeteners in Food (Amendment) Regulations (Northern Ireland) 1997 (S.R. 1997 No. 257)
 Child Support Commissioners (Procedure) (Amendment) Regulations (Northern Ireland) 1997 (S.R. 1997 No. 258)
 Royal Ulster Constabulary Pensions (Amendment) Regulations 1997 (S.R. 1997 No. 259)
 Royal Ulster Constabulary Reserve (Full-time) Pensions (Amendment) Regulations 1997 (S.R. 1997 No. 260)
 Royal Ulster Constabulary Reserve (Part-time) Pensions Regulations 1997 (S.R. 1997 No. 261)
 Legal Aid in Criminal Proceedings (Costs) (Amendment) Rules (Northern Ireland) 1997 (S.R. 1997 No. 262)
 General Medical and Pharmaceutical Services (Amendment No. 2) Regulations (Northern Ireland) 1997 (S.R. 1997 No. 264)
 Rules of the Supreme Court (Northern Ireland) (Amendment No. 2) 1997 (S.R. 1997 No. 265)
 Crown Court (Criminal Procedure and Investigations Act 1996) (Tainted Acquittals) Rules (Northern Ireland) 1997 (S.R. 1997 No. 266)
 Criminal Justice (1996 Order) (Commencement No. 1) Order (Northern Ireland) 1997 (S.R. 1997 No. 267)
 Criminal Justice (Northern Ireland) Order 1996 (Offensive Weapons) (Exemption) Order (Northern Ireland) 1997 (S.R. 1997 No. 268)
 Deregulation (Model Appeal Provisions) Order (Northern Ireland) 1997 (S.R. 1997 No. 269)
 Proceeds of Crime (Countries and Territories designated under the Drug Trafficking Act 1994) Order (Northern Ireland) 1997 (S.R. 1997 No. 270)
 Register of Occupational and Personal Pension Schemes (Amendment) Regulations (Northern Ireland) 1997 (S.R. 1997 No. 271)
 Animals (Third Country Imports) (Charges) Regulations (Northern Ireland) 1997 (S.R. 1997 No. 272)
 Race Relations (1997 Order) (Commencement) Order (Northern Ireland) 1997 (S.R. 1997 No. 273)
 Divorce etc. (Pensions) (Amendment) Regulations (Northern Ireland) 1997 (S.R. 1997 No. 275)
 Licensing (Conditions for Mixed Trading) Regulations (Northern Ireland) 1997 (S.R. 1997 No. 277)
 Magistrates' Courts (Criminal Procedure and Investigations Act 1996) (Tainted Acquittals) Rules (Northern Ireland) 1997 (S.R. 1997 No. 278)
 Road Traffic Offenders (1996 Order) (Commencement No. 1) Order (Northern Ireland) 1997 (S.R. 1997 No. 279)
 Road Traffic Offenders (Prescribed Devices) Order (Northern Ireland) 1997 (S.R. 1997 No. 280)
 Protection from Harassment (1997 Order) (Commencement No. 1) Order (Northern Ireland) 1997 (S.R. 1997 No. 286)
 Court Funds (Amendment No. 2) Rules (Northern Ireland) 1997 (S.R. 1997 No. 295)
 Lands Tribunal (Salaries) Order (Northern Ireland) 1997 (S.R. 1997 No. 296)
 Environmentally Sensitive Areas (Antrim Coast, Glens and Rathlin) Designation (Amendment) Order (Northern Ireland) 1997 (S.R. 1997 No. 297)
 Environmentally Sensitive Areas (Slieve Gullion) Designation (Amendment) Order (Northern Ireland) 1997 (S.R. 1997 No. 298)
 Environmentally Sensitive Areas (Mourne Mountains and Slieve Croob) Designation (Amendment) Order (Northern Ireland) 1997 (S.R. 1997 No. 299)
 Environmentally Sensitive Areas (West Fermanagh and Erne Lakeland) Designation (Amendment) Order (Northern Ireland) 1997 (S.R. 1997 No. 300)

301-400

 Environmentally Sensitive Areas (Sperrins) Designation (Amendment) Order (Northern Ireland) 1997 (S.R. 1997 No. 301)
 Road Vehicles Lighting (Amendment) Regulations (Northern Ireland) 1997 (S.R. 1997 No. 305)
 Salaries (Comptroller and Auditor General) Order (Northern Ireland) 1997 (S.R. 1997 No. 306)
 Education (1996 Order) (Commencement No. 2) Order (Northern Ireland) 1997 (S.R. 1997 No. 307)
 Public Service Vehicles (Conditions of Fitness, Equipment and Use) (Amendment) Regulations (Northern Ireland) 1997 (S.R. 1997 No. 308)
 Teachers' (Eligibility) Regulations (Northern Ireland) 1997 (S.R. 1997 No. 312)
 Companies (Forms) (Amendment) Regulations (Northern Ireland) 1997 (S.R. 1997 No. 313)
 Companies (1986 Order) (Miscellaneous Accounting Amendments) Regulations (Northern Ireland) 1997 (S.R. 1997 No. 314)
 Special Educational Needs Tribunal Regulations (Northern Ireland) 1997 (S.R. 1997 No. 315)
 Social Security Administration (Fraud) (1997 Order) (Commencement No. 1) Order (Northern Ireland) 1997 (S.R. 1997 No. 316)
 Bovine Products (Production and Despatch) Regulations (Northern Ireland) 1997 (S.R. 1997 No. 319)
 Race Relations (Interest on Awards) Order (Northern Ireland) 1997 (S.R. 1997 No. 320)
 Race Relations (Formal Investigations) Regulations (Northern Ireland) 1997 (S.R. 1997 No. 321)
 Race Relations (Questions and Replies) Order (Northern Ireland) 1997 (S.R. 1997 No. 322)
 Fire Services (Appointments and Promotion) (Amendment) Regulations (Northern Ireland) 1997 (S.R. 1997 No. 324)
 Foyle Area (Control of Fishing) (Revocation) Regulations 1997 (S.R. 1997 No. 325)
 Game Birds Preservation Order (Northern Ireland) 1997 (S.R. 1997 No. 326)
 Education (Special Educational Needs) Regulations (Northern Ireland) 1997 (S.R. 1997 No. 327)
 Property (1997 Order) (Commencement No. 1) Order (Northern Ireland) 1997 (S.R. 1997 No. 328)
 Social Security (Miscellaneous Amendments No. 3) Regulations (Northern Ireland) 1997 (S.R. 1997 No. 330)
 Income-Related Benefits and Jobseeker's Allowance (Amendment) Regulations (Northern Ireland) 1997 (S.R. 1997 No. 331)
 Registration of Clubs (Accounts) Regulations (Northern Ireland) 1997 (S.R. 1997 No. 333)
 Road Traffic Offenders (1996 Order) (Commencement No. 2) Order (Northern Ireland) 1997 (S.R. 1997 No. 336)
 Contaminants in Food Regulations (Northern Ireland) 1997 (S.R. 1997 No. 338)
 Social Security (United States of America) Order (Northern Ireland) 1997 (S.R. 1997 No. 339)
 Miscellaneous Food Additives (Amendment) Regulations (Northern Ireland) 1997 (S.R. 1997 No. 340)
 Education (School Information and Prospectuses) (Amendment) Regulations (Northern Ireland) 1997 (S.R. 1997 No. 341)
 Legal Advice and Assistance (Amendment No. 2) Regulations (Northern Ireland) 1997 (S.R. 1997 No. 342)
 Legal Aid (Assessment of Resources) (Amendment) Regulations (Northern Ireland) 1997 (S.R. 1997 No. 343)
 Road Traffic Fixed Penalties (Enforcement of Fines) Regulations (Northern Ireland) 1997 (S.R. 1997 No. 344)
 Welfare of Animals (Transport) (Remedial Action and Cost Recovery) Regulations (Northern Ireland) 1997 (S.R. 1997 No. 345)
 Welfare of Animals (Transport) Order (Northern Ireland) 1997 (S.R. 1997 No. 346)
 Industrial Training Levy (Construction Industry) Orde (Northern Ireland) 1997 (S.R. 1997 No. 349)
 Education (Student Loans) Regulations (Northern Ireland) 1997 (S.R. 1997 No. 350)
 Habitat Improvement (Amendment) Regulations (Northern Ireland) 1997 (S.R. 1997 No. 351)
 Specified Diseases (Notification and Movement Restrictions) Order (Northern Ireland) 1997 (S.R. 1997 No. 352)
 Horse Racing (Charges on Bookmakers) Order (Northern Ireland) 1997 (S.R. 1997 No. 353)
 Social Security (Lone Parents) (Amendment) Regulations (Northern Ireland) 1997 (S.R. 1997 No. 354)
 Social Security (Attendance Allowance and Disability Living Allowance) (Miscellaneous Amendments) Regulations (Northern Ireland) 1997 (S.R. 1997 No. 355)
 Carriage of Dangerous Goods (Classification, Packaging and Labelling) and Use of Transportable Pressure Receptacles (Amendment) Regulations (Northern Ireland) 1997 (S.R. 1997 No. 360)
 Students Awards Regulations (Northern Ireland) 1997 (S.R. 1997 No. 361)
 Royal Ulster Constabulary (Amendment) Regulations 1997 (S.R. 1997 No. 362)
 Royal Ulster Constabulary Reserve (Full-time) (Appointment and Conditions of Service) (Amendment) Regulations 1997 (S.R. 1997 No. 363)
 Royal Ulster Constabulary Reserve (Part-time) (Appointment and Conditions of Service) (Amendment) Regulations 1997 (S.R. 1997 No. 364)
 Motor Hackney Carriages (Belfast) (Amendment) By-Laws (Northern Ireland) 1997 (S.R. 1997 No. 365)
 Noise Act 1996 (Commencement) Order (Northern Ireland) 1997 (S.R. 1997 No. 366)
 Certification Officer (Fees) Regulations (Northern Ireland) 1997 (S.R. 1997 No. 367)
 Road Traffic (Fixed Penalty) Order (Northern Ireland) 1997 (S.R. 1997 No. 368)
 Road Traffic (Fixed Penalty) (Offences) Order (Northern Ireland) 1997 (S.R. 1997 No. 369)
 Road Traffic Offenders (Appropriate Driving Test) Order (Northern Ireland) 1997 (S.R. 1997 No. 370)
 Motor Vehicles (Construction and Use) (Amendment No. 2) Regulations (Northern Ireland) 1997 (S.R. 1997 No. 371)
 Road Traffic Offenders (1996 Order) (Commencement No. 3) Order (Northern Ireland) 1997 (S.R. 1997 No. 372)
 Road Traffic (Courses for Drink-Drive Offenders) Regulations (Northern Ireland) 1997 (S.R. 1997 No. 373)
 Road Traffic Fixed Penalty (Procedure) Regulations (Northern Ireland) 1997 (S.R. 1997 No. 374)
 Motor Cars (Silence Zones) (Revocation) Regulations (Northern Ireland) 1997 (S.R. 1997 No. 375)
 Housing Benefit (General) (Amendment No. 5) Regulations (Northern Ireland) 1997 (S.R. 1997 No. 376)
 Housing Benefit (General) (Amendment No. 6) Regulations (Northern Ireland) 1997 (S.R. 1997 No. 377)
 Fertilisers (Amendment) Regulations (Northern Ireland) 1997 (S.R. 1997 No. 378)
 Bovines and Bovine Products (Despatch Prohibition and Production Restriction) Regulations (Northern Ireland) 1997 (S.R. 1997 No. 379)
 General Medical Services Regulations (Northern Ireland) 1997 (S.R. 1997 No. 380)
 Charges for Drugs and Appliances Regulations (Northern Ireland) 1997 (S.R. 1997 No. 382)
 Motor Vehicles (Driving Licences) (Amendment) Regulations (Northern Ireland) 1997 (S.R. 1997 No. 383)
 Employment (Miscellaneous Provisions) (1990 Order) (Commencement No. 2) Order (Northern Ireland) 1997 (S.R. 1997 No. 385)
 Health and Safety (Young Persons) Regulations (Northern Ireland) 1997 (S.R. 1997 No. 387)
 Further Education Teachers' (Eligibility) Regulations (Northern Ireland) 1997 (S.R. 1997 No. 388)
 Health and Personal Social Services (Superannuation) (Amendment No. 2) Regulations (Northern Ireland) 1997 (S.R. 1997 No. 390)
 Departments (Transfer of Functions) Order (Northern Ireland) 1997 (S.R. 1997 No. 391)
 Income Support (General) (Standard Interest Rate Amendment No. 2) Regulations (Northern Ireland) 1997 (S.R. 1997 No. 395)
 Transport of Animals and Poultry (Cleansing and Disinfection) Order (Northern Ireland) 1997 (S.R. 1997 No. 396)
 Plant Health (Amendment No. 2) Order (Northern Ireland) 1997 (S.R. 1997 No. 397)
 Chemicals (Hazard Information and Packaging for Supply) (Amendment) Regulations (Northern Ireland) 1997 (S.R. 1997 No. 398)
 Education (Assessment Arrangements for Key Stages 1 and 2) (Amendment) Order (Northern Ireland) 1997 (S.R. 1997 No. 399)
 Social Security (Recovery of Benefits) (1997 Order) (Commencement) Order (Northern Ireland) 1997 (S.R. 1997 No. 400)

401-500

 Explosives (Fireworks) Regulations (Northern Ireland) 1997 (S.R. 1997 No. 401)
 Seed Potatoes (Amendment) Regulations (Northern Ireland) 1997 (S.R. 1997 No. 402)
 Proceeds of Crime (Enforcement of Confiscation Orders made in England and Wales or Scotland) Order (Northern Ireland) 1997 (S.R. 1997 No. 403)
 Pneumoconiosis, etc., (Workers' Compensation) (Payment of Claims) (Amendment) Regulations (Northern Ireland) 1997 (S.R. 1997 No. 409)
 Road Traffic Regulation (1997 Order) (Commencement No. 1) Order (Northern Ireland) 1997 (S.R. 1997 No. 410)
 Income-Related Benefits and Jobseeker's Allowance (Amendment No. 2) Regulations (Northern Ireland) 1997 (S.R. 1997 No. 412)
 Seeds (Fees) Regulations (Northern Ireland) 1997 (S.R. 1997 No. 413)
 Social Security (Claims and Payments and Adjudication) (Amendment) Regulations (Northern Ireland) 1997 (S.R. 1997 No. 417)
 Food (Pistachios from Iran) (Emergency Control) Order (Northern Ireland) 1997 (S.R. 1997 No. 421)
 Education (Assessment Arrangements for Key Stage 3) Order (Northern Ireland) 1997 (S.R. 1997 No. 422)
 Companies (Revision of Defective Accounts and Report) (Amendment) Regulations (Northern Ireland) 1997 (S.R. 1997 No. 423)
 Fisheries Byelaws (Northern Ireland) 1997 (S.R. 1997 No. 425)
 Child Support Commissioners (Procedure) (Amendment No. 2) Regulations (Northern Ireland) 1997 (S.R. 1997 No. 426)
 Social Security Commissioners Procedure (Amendment) Regulations (Northern Ireland) 1997 (S.R. 1997 No. 427)
 Magistrates' Courts (Amendment) Rules (Northern Ireland) 1997 (S.R. 1997 No. 428)
 Social Security (Recovery of Benefits) Regulations (Northern Ireland) 1997 (S.R. 1997 No. 429)
 Social Security (Recovery of Benefits) (Appeals) Regulations (Northern Ireland) 1997 (S.R. 1997 No. 430)
 Councillors (Travelling and Subsistence Allowances) (Amendment) Regulations (Northern Ireland) 1997 (S.R. 1997 No. 431)
 Processed Cereal-based Foods and Baby Foods for Infants and Young Children Regulations (Northern Ireland) 1997 (S.R. 1997 No. 432)
 Social Security (Miscellaneous Amendments No. 4) Regulations (Northern Ireland) 1997 (S.R. 1997 No. 435)
 Companies (1986 Order) (Accounts of Small and Medium-sized Companies and Minor Accounting Amendments) Regulations (Northern Ireland) 1997 (S.R. 1997 No. 436)
 Social Fund (Cold Weather Payments) (General) (Amendment) Regulations (Northern Ireland) 1997 (S.R. 1997 No. 437)
 Primary Schools (Admissions Criteria) Regulations (Northern Ireland) 1997 (S.R. 1997 No. 438)
 Secondary Schools (Admissions Criteria) Regulations (Northern Ireland) 1997 (S.R. 1997 No. 439)
 Travelling Expenses and Remission of Charges (Amendment No. 2) Regulations (Northern Ireland) 1997 (S.R. 1997 No. 440)
 National Board for Nursing, Midwifery and Health Visiting for Northern Ireland (Constitution and Administration) Amendment Order (Northern Ireland) 1997 (S.R. 1997 No. 441)
 Police (Property) Regulations (Northern Ireland) 1997 (S.R. 1997 No. 448)
 Social Security Administration (Fraud) (1997 Order) (Commencement No. 2) Order (Northern Ireland) 1997 (S.R. 1997 No. 449)
 Foods Intended for Use in Energy Restricted Diets for Weight Reduction Regulations (Northern Ireland) 1997 (S.R. 1997 No. 450)
 Eggs (Marketing Standards) (Amendment No. 2) Regulations (Northern Ireland) 1997 (S.R. 1997 No. 451)
 Housing Benefit (General) (Amendment No. 7) Regulations (Northern Ireland) 1997 (S.R. 1997 No. 452)
 Housing Benefit (Information from Landlords and Agents) Regulations (Northern Ireland) 1997 (S.R. 1997 No. 453)
 Housing Benefit (Recovery of Overpayments) Regulations (Northern Ireland) 1997 (S.R. 1997 No. 454)
 Reporting of Injuries, Diseases and Dangerous Occurrences Regulations (Northern Ireland) 1997 (S.R. 1997 No. 455)
 Housing Renovation etc. Grants (Reduction of Grant) Regulations (Northern Ireland) 1997 (S.R. 1997 No. 456)
 Commissioner for Complaints (1997 Amendment Order) (Commencement) Order (Northern Ireland) 1997 (S.R. 1997 No. 457)
 Optical Charges and Payments (Amendment) Regulations (Northern Ireland) 1997 (S.R. 1997 No. 458)
 Welfare Foods (Amendment) (No. 2) Regulations (Northern Ireland) 1997 (S.R. 1997 No. 461)
 Dogs (Licensing and Identification) (Amendment) Regulations (Northern Ireland) 1997 (S.R. 1997 No. 462)
 Eel Fishing (Licence Duties) Regulations (Northern Ireland) 1997 (S.R. 1997 No. 463)
 Royal Ulster Constabulary Pensions (Additional Voluntary Contributions) (Amendment) Regulations 1997 (S.R. 1997 No. 464)
 Transport of Animals and Poultry (Cleansing and Disinfection) (No. 2) Order (Northern Ireland) 1997 (S.R. 1997 No. 466)
 Motorways Traffic (Amendment) Regulations (Northern Ireland) 1997 (S.R. 1997 No. 468)
 Control of Pesticides (Amendment) Regulations (Northern Ireland) 1997 (S.R. 1997 No. 469)
 Plant Protection Products (Basic Conditions) Regulations (Northern Ireland) 1997 (S.R. 1997 No. 470)
 Plant Protection Products (Amendment) Regulations (Northern Ireland) 1997 (S.R. 1997 No. 471)
 Social Fund (Maternity and Funeral Expenses) (General) (Amendment) Regulations (Northern Ireland) 1997 (S.R. 1997 No. 472)
 Occupational Pension Schemes (Payments to Employers) (Amendment) Regulations (Northern Ireland) 1997 (S.R. 1997 No. 473)
 Carriage of Explosives by Road Regulations (Northern Ireland) 1997 (S.R. 1997 No. 474)
 Carriage of Explosives by Road (Driver Training) Regulations (Northern Ireland) 1997 (S.R. 1997 No. 475)
 Income Support (General) (Standard Interest Rate Amendment No. 3) Regulations (Northern Ireland) 1997 (S.R. 1997 No. 476)
 Arable Area Payments Regulations (Northern Ireland) 1997 (S.R. 1997 No. 477)
 Potatoes Originating in the Netherlands (Notification) Regulations (Northern Ireland) 1997 (S.R. 1997 No. 478)
 Judicial Pensions (Requisite Surviving Spouses' Benefits etc.) Order (Northern Ireland) 1997 (S.R. 1997 No. 479)
 Social Security Administration (Fraud) (1997 Order) (Commencement No. 3) Order (Northern Ireland) 1997 (S.R. 1997 No. 480)
 Building (Amendment) Regulations (Northern Ireland) 1997 (S.R. 1997 No. 481)
 Building (Prescribed Fees) Regulations (Northern Ireland) 1997 (S.R. 1997 No. 482)
 Social Security (National Insurance Number Information: Exemption) Regulations (Northern Ireland) 1997 (S.R. 1997 No. 483)
 Jobseeker's Allowance (Amendment) Regulations (Northern Ireland) 1997 (S.R. 1997 No. 484)
 Sheep Annual Premium (Amendment) Regulations (Northern Ireland) 1997 (S.R. 1997 No. 485)
 Hill Livestock (Compensatory Allowances) (Amendment) Regulations (Northern Ireland) 1997 (S.R. 1997 No. 486)
 Surface Waters (Fishlife) (Classification) Regulations (Northern Ireland) 1997 (S.R. 1997 No. 488)
 Surface Waters (Shellfish) (Classification) Regulations (Northern Ireland) 1997 (S.R. 1997 No. 489)
 Food Safety (Enforcement) Order (Northern Ireland) 1997 (S.R. 1997 No. 492)
 Fresh Meat (Hygiene and Inspection) Regulations (Northern Ireland) 1997 (S.R. 1997 No. 493)
 Meat Products (Hygiene) Regulations (Northern Ireland) 1997 (S.R. 1997 No. 494)
 Minced Meat and Meat Preparations (Hygiene) Regulations (Northern Ireland) 1997 (S.R. 1997 No. 495)
 Wild Game Meat (Hygiene and Inspection) Regulations (Northern Ireland) 1997 (S.R. 1997 No. 496)
 Court Funds (Amendment No. 3) Rules (Northern Ireland) 1997 (S.R. 1997 No. 497)
 Court Funds (Amendment No. 3) Rules (Northern Ireland) 1997 (S.R. 1997 No. 499)
 Companies (1986 Order) (Audit Exemption) (Amendment) Regulations (Northern Ireland) 1997 (S.R. 1997 No. 500)

501-600

 Companies (1986 Order) (Directors' Report) (Statement of Payment Practice) Regulations (Northern Ireland) 1997 (S.R. 1997 No. 501)
 Fair Employment (Specification of Public Authorities) (Amendment) Order (Northern Ireland) 1997 (S.R. 1997 No. 504)
 Plant Protection Products (Amendment) (No. 2) Regulations (Northern Ireland) 1997 (S.R. 1997 No. 507)
 Social Security Administration (Fraud) (1997 Order) (Commencement No. 4) Order (Northern Ireland) 1997 (S.R. 1997 No. 508)
 Fisheries (Licence Duties) Byelaws (Northern Ireland) 1997 (S.R. 1997 No. 509)
 Occupational Pensions (Revaluation) Order (Northern Ireland) 1997 (S.R. 1997 No. 511)
 Social Security (Penalty Notice) Regulations (Northern Ireland) 1997 (S.R. 1997 No. 514)
 Income-Related Benefits (Miscellaneous Amendments) Regulations (Northern Ireland) 1997 (S.R. 1997 No. 515)
 Insolvent Companies (Reports on Conduct of Directors) Rules (Northern Ireland) 1997 (S.R. 1997 No. 516)
 Motor Vehicles (Construction and Use) (Amendment No. 3) Regulations (Northern Ireland) 1997 (S.R. 1997 No. 518)
 Crown Court (Criminal Procedure and Investigations Act 1996) (Confidentiality) Rules (Northern Ireland) 1997 (S.R. 1997 No. 519)
 Crown Court (Criminal Procedure and Investigations Act 1996) (Disclosure) Rules (Northern Ireland) 1997 (S.R. 1997 No. 520)
 Deseasonalisation Premium (Protection of Payments) (Amendment) Regulations (Northern Ireland) 1997 (S.R. 1997 No. 521)
 Local Government (Competition in Functional Work) (Amendment) Regulations (Northern Ireland) 1997 (S.R. 1997 No. 522)
 Criminal Justice (1996 Order) (Commencement No. 2) Order (Northern Ireland) 1997 (S.R. 1997 No. 523)
 Health Services (Primary Care) (1997 Order) (Commencement No. 1) Order (Northern Ireland) 1997 (S.R. 1997 No. 524)
 Section 2 (C.1) of the Petroleum Act 1987 (Modification) Regulations (Northern Ireland) 1997 (S.R. 1997 No. 528)
 Magistrates' Courts (Amendment No. 2) Rules (Northern Ireland) 1997 (S.R. 1997 No. 529)
 Magistrates' Courts (Children and Young Persons) (Amendment) Rules (Northern Ireland) 1997 (S.R. 1997 No. 530)
 Magistrates' Courts (Criminal Procedure and Investigations Act 1996) (Disclosure) Rules (Northern Ireland) 1997 (S.R. 1997 No. 531)
 Magistrates' Courts (Criminal Procedure and Investigations Act 1996) (Confidentiality) Rules (Northern Ireland) 1997 (S.R. 1997 No. 532)
 Magistrates' Courts (Advance Notice of Expert Evidence) Rules (Northern Ireland) 1997 (S.R. 1997 No. 533)
 Genetically Modified Organisms (Deliberate Release and Risk Assessment) (Amendment) Regulations (Northern Ireland) 1997 (S.R. 1997 No. 534)
 Magistrates' Courts (Domestic Proceedings) (Amendment) Rules (Northern Ireland) 1997 (S.R. 1997 No. 538)
 Beef Bones Regulations (Northern Ireland) 1997 (S.R. 1997 No. 540)
 Social Security (Amendment) (New Deal) Regulations (Northern Ireland) 1997 (S.R. 1997 No. 541)
 Rules of the Supreme Court (Northern Ireland) (Amendment No. 3) 1997 (S.R. 1997 No. 543)
 Personal and Occupational Pension Schemes (Miscellaneous Amendments No. 2) Regulations (Northern Ireland) 1997 (S.R. 1997 No. 544)
 Company Accounts (Disclosure of Directors' Emoluments) Regulations (Northern Ireland) 1997 (S.R. 1997 No. 545)
 Pharmaceutical Services (Amendment) Regulations (Northern Ireland) 1997 (S.R. 1997 No. 547)
 Zoonoses Order (Northern Ireland) 1997 (S.R. 1997 No. 548)
 Specified Risk Material Order (Northern Ireland) 1997 (S.R. 1997 No. 551)
 Specified Risk Material Regulations (Northern Ireland) 1997 (S.R. 1997 No. 552)
 Bovine Spongiform Encephalopathy Order (Northern Ireland) 1997 (S.R. 1997 No. 553)
 Social Security (Claims and Payments) (Amendment) Regulations (Northern Ireland) 1997 (S.R. 1997 No. 554)
 Construction (Use of Explosives) Regulations (Northern Ireland) 1997 (S.R. 1997 No. 555)

External links
  Statutory Rules (NI) List
 Draft Statutory Rules (NI) List

1997
Statutory rules
Northern Ireland Statutory Rules